Bottrel/Anchor 9 Ranch Aerodrome  is a registered aerodrome located  west of Bottrel, Alberta, Canada.

References

Rocky View County
Registered aerodromes in Alberta